Charisa Marie Casalda Lemoran (born September 21, 1998) is a Filipino footballer who has played for the Philippines women's national football team.

Youth career
Prior to college, Lemoran represented her hometown of San Carlos winning several titles in Negros Occidental provincial tournaments.

College career
Charisa Marie Casalda Lemoran plays for the University of Santo Tomas (UST) women's team which competes in University Athletic Association of the Philippines (UAAP) Football Championship. In 2016, Lemoran debuted for UST as a first year student in UAAP Season 78 scoring at least three goals. UST also played at the PFF Women's League, which featured both club and collegiate sides. In the 2016–17 season she was named as Best Midfielder.

In 2017, at UAAP Season 79, she led her school by scoring 11 of 16 goals scored by UST in the entire season. Her feat lead to the return of UST in the final where it lost to the De La Salle University. She was name part of Mythical XI team for the season along with three other teammates.

Lemoran was named as the Most Promising Player at the Dumaguete–Negros Oriental-hosted 3rd Pinay in Action Cup, an invitational collegiate tournament UST joined and won. She managed to help her team reach the final again in UAAP Season 80 in 2018 and faced De La Salle once again by scoring seven goals. Lemoran was instrumental in scoring an equalizing goal of the match, passing the ball to Shelah Cadag who scored the goal but ultimately lost that match against De La Salle which ended in a 1–2 defeat.

International career
Lemoran received her first call up to Philippines women's national football team in 2017 and was set to play in the 2017 Southeast Asian Games. She was not initially included in the training pool in July 2017 but the injury of some players led to her inclusion. She was also considered to form the Philippine squad which participated at the 2018 AFC Women's Asian Cup qualifiers but had to beg off due to academic reasons. She also played in the 2018 AFF Women's Championship.

International goals
Scores and results list Philippines's goal tally first.

References

Living people
Filipino women's footballers
Philippines women's international footballers
Women's association football midfielders
University of Santo Tomas alumni
University Athletic Association of the Philippines footballers
1998 births
Competitors at the 2019 Southeast Asian Games
People from San Carlos, Negros Occidental
Southeast Asian Games competitors for the Philippines